The Society of Actuaries (SOA) is a global professional organization for actuaries. It was founded in 1949 as the merger of two major actuarial organizations in the United States: the Actuarial Society of America and the American Institute of Actuaries. It is a full member organization of the International Actuarial Association.

Through education and research, the SOA advances actuaries as leaders in measuring and managing risk to improve financial outcomes for individuals, organizations, and the public. The SOA's vision is for actuaries to be highly sought-after professionals who develop and communicate solutions for complex financial issues. The SOA provides primary and continuing education for students and practicing actuaries, maintains high professional standards for actuaries, and conducts research on actuarial trends and public policy issues.

A global organization, the SOA represents actuaries from all major areas of practice, including life and health insurance, retirement and pensions, investment and finance, enterprise risk management, and general insurance (property and casualty) insurance. The Casualty Actuarial Society also represents actuaries working with property and casualty.

The SOA, along with its public relations firm Golin, won the PRWeek Corporate Branding Campaign of the Year award for 2008. The award was given for the SOA's efforts to revitalize the actuarial profession's brand in the U.S., including the slogan "Risk is Opportunity."

History
The Society was founded as a merger of two major American actuarial associations, as reflected in its logo: the Actuarial Society of America (ASA) and the American Institute of Actuaries (AIA).

The Actuarial Society of America was the first actuarial professional association in North America, founded in 1889 with only 38 members and headquartered in New York City. Initial members were included by invitation, but the organization soon adopted a system of examination for qualification, with the first Fellow to qualify via exams joining in 1900.

The American Institute of Actuaries was founded in 1909. Based in Chicago, it attracted members from life insurance companies in the midwestern and southern United States. The formation of the AIA, which (like the ASA) was geared toward actuaries in the field of life insurance, was followed within the decade by the creation of two other specialized actuarial organizations: the Casualty Actuarial Society, which still exists today, and the Fraternal Actuarial Association which dissolved in 1980.

Between the two organizations, which came to have some overlap in membership, the number of recognized professional actuaries climbed from the initial 38 to over 1000 by the time the two organizations merged in 1949 to form the SOA. The SOA has seen continued growth since then, now recognizing over 30,000 professional actuaries as active members.

Leadership structure
The SOA is headed by a board of directors, consisting of a president, president-elect, and fifteen other board members. In addition, the most recent past president is a member of the board.

The board positions are filled by election. A member of the society is eligible to vote in board elections if they have the title of FSA, or if they have held the title of ASA for at least five years, and only FSAs can be elected to the board. (See the Membership section below for information on the professional titles granted by the society.) Regular board members are elected for terms of three years. The president-elect is elected for a term of one year, after which he or she becomes the president for a term of one year.

The employees of the SOA are headed by the chief executive officer, a salaried position appointed by the board of directors.

SOA Elections
The SOA holds its elections annually in late summer or early fall for its board of directors and the Section Councils.  In the board of directors election, one president-elect, and six elected board members are elected each year. Elected board members serve three–year terms. The president–elect serves three one–year terms as president–elect, president and past president.

In section elections, generally one third of the council is elected each year as members serve three–year terms. Section councils select their officers (chair, vice chair, and secretary/treasurer).

According to the SOA Bylaws, fellows and associates who have been members of the society for five years or more are entitled to vote in the board of directors' election. According to the Section Bylaws, all members of a Section are entitled to vote in the Section Council election. This includes ASAs, FSAs, and members of co–sponsoring organizations who are also members of a Section. SOA members with valid e–mail addresses in the SOA database are sent login credentials to vote online. Members without valid email addresses, or who notify the SOA of their request, receive paper ballots.

Membership
The society's members are involved in the life, health, pension and general insurance areas of the actuarial profession. There are three designations offered by the SOA. The two Associate-level designations are Associate of Society of Actuaries (ASA) and Chartered Enterprise Risk Analyst (CERA), which was introduced in 2007. The highest designation is Fellow of the Society of Actuaries (FSA). The SOA has more than 30,000 actuaries as members.

Requirements for membership for the SOA include the actuarial exams, a comprehensive series of competitive exams. Topics covered in the exams include mathematics, finance, insurance, economics, interest theory, life models, and actuarial science. Non-members working in the actuarial profession and taking exams are often referred to as actuarial students or candidates.

Members of the SOA who meet a professional experience requirement are eligible for membership in the American Academy of Actuaries, which represents United States actuaries from all practice areas.

Examination system
Professional designations in the Society are earned by completing a rigorous system of examinations. It is common for actuarial students to work full-time in the profession while studying for the exams.

The first seven ("preliminary") exams consist mostly of core mathematics related to actuarial science including probability, statistics, interest theory, life contingencies, and risk models.

In 2016, the SOA announced changes to the curriculum for candidates seeking the associate designation and the Chartered Enterprise Risk Analyst credential. In total, the number of components for Associateship from the SOA will increase from ten to twelve components, with three VEE subjects, seven formally examined subjects. These changes are in effect July 2018 and reflect an emphasis on predictive analytics, and also provides a curriculum balance between long-term and short-term insurance coverages.

A series of online learning modules, called the Fundamentals of Actuarial Practice (FAP), are intended to be taken after the preliminary exams. They cover real-world topics such as insurance and professionalism with readings, case studies and projects. The preliminary exams and FAP modules comprise the majority of the education requirement for the ASA designation.

Upper-level exam topics for the FSA designation include plan design, risk classification, enterprise risk management, ratemaking and valuation. Three fellowship exams are taken in one of six specialization tracks chosen by the candidate – Finance & Enterprise Risk Management, Investments, Individual Life Insurance & Annuities, Retirement Benefits, Group & Health Insurance, or General Insurance. The SOA is updating the Fellowship tracks beginning in late 2018. Candidates completing the Finance & Enterprise Risk Management track will also earn the CERA designation. Candidates in any of the other five tracks have the option of replacing their track-specific Enterprise Risk Management exam with a more generalized ERM exam in order to obtain the CERA designation in addition to FSA.

See also
American Academy of Actuaries
Casualty Actuarial Society
List of learned societies

References

External links
Official Website
The Actuary magazine

Actuarial associations
Professional associations based in the United States
Organizations based in Schaumburg, Illinois
Non-profit organizations based in Illinois